is a 1969 Japanese New Wave film directed by Nagisa Ōshima.

Synopsis
The film centers around Birdie, a young Japanese book thief who is caught by a store clerk named Umeko.  As their encounters grow increasingly fraught with tension and desire, the two become lovers and begin committing thefts together. They also take part in a kabuki play based on the lives of Yui Shōsetsu and Marubashi Chūya.

Cast
 Tadanori Yokoo as Birdey Hilltop
 Rie Yokoyama as Umeko Suzuki
 Kei Satō
 Jūrō Kara as himself / Singer
 Moichi Tanabe
 Tetsu Takahashi
 Rokko Toura as himself
 Fumio Watanabe as himself
 Reisen Ri

Reception
Roger Greenspun of The New York Times called most of the film dull "with an air of having been produced only for purposes of demonstration", concluding that "the result is a high-powered sterility in the midst of much energetic busyness." The film was described by Ronald Bergan, in his Guardian obituary of Oshima, as "an explosive agitprop movie equating sexual liberation with revolution, whose impact has cooled only marginally."

References

External links
 
 

1969 films
Japanese comedy-drama films
1960s Japanese-language films
Films directed by Nagisa Ōshima
Films shot in Tokyo
1960s Japanese films